Sarithiran Raa (also known as RJ Sarithiran) is an Indian film actor and radio jockey. He is known for his pranks and show Sarithiranin Narithanam On BIG FM 92.7.

Career 
Sarithiran started his film career in 2004 from the film Kovil where he played a junior artist role. He also worked with R. Rahesh film Oru CD 30 Ruba as a lyricist, The film produced by Ven Govinda for Tag Entertainments. In 2013 he got another chance for a film Pattathu Yaanai and played a role of Vada Ganesan and in 2015 he acted in a film Thakka Thakka.

In 2019 Sarithiran did acting in the Aadai movie as a Sukumar Directed by Rathna Kumar the story was about a daring woman who dares to break stereotypes. The movie teaser has crossed over 6 million views on YouTube in just a week.

Sarithiran played the role of food delivery agent in a short film "Sweet Biriyani". The film was screened in 52nd International Film Festival of India which was held at Indian State Goa. He played the character of Marimuthu and Gowtham, audience special request Sarithiran hit the floor with signature walk of Marimuthu.

In 2022, he performed Ramesh character in "Payanigal Gavanikkavum" film.

Filmography

External links

References

Indian radio journalists
Indian film actors
Living people
Year of birth missing (living people)